To My Queen Revisited is an album by vibraphonist Walt Dickerson's Quartet recorded in 1978 for the SteepleChase label. The album references Dickerson's 1962 album To My Queen and the title composition.

Reception

Allmusic gave the album 3 stars.

Track listing
All compositions by Walt Dickerson
 "Liz" – 5:30
 "The Ultimate You" – 13:43
 "To My Queen Revisited" – 23:49	
 "Liz" [take 1] – 5:32 Bonus track on CD reissue

Personnel 
Walt Dickerson – vibraphone
Albert Dailey – piano
Andy McKee – bass
Jimmi Johnsun – drums

References 

1979 albums
Walt Dickerson albums
SteepleChase Records albums